The Trento–Venice railway is an Italian state-owned railway line connecting Trento, in Trentino-Alto Adige, to Mestre, a suburb of Venice, in the Veneto region. At Mestre, it connects to the main line from Verona.

The line is managed by RFI, a company of the Ferrovie dello Stato group. Passenger traffic is run by Trenitalia, which also runs regional trains ordered by the Veneto region; in the province of Trento, Trentino Trasporti fulfills this role (line 401).

History 
Railway lines had been built from Trento, in what was then part of Austria-Hungary, in 1859 southwards to Verona, and in 1867 northwards to Bolzano and the Brenner pass; today these form the Brenner Railway, the main railway connection between Italy and Austria. On the Italian side a line was built from Bassano del Grappa to Padua in 1877, and an extension to the Italian-Austrian border at Primolano was studied. However, when the Veneto joined the Kingdom of Italy, a new border was established at Tezze di Grigno, and hence the Austrians constructed a railway from Trento to Tezze in 1896, where it joined the Italian Valsugana railway line.

On the Italian side, the line from Mestre via Primolano to the border was built between 1906 and 1910, with the first part, to Bassano del Grappa, opening in 1908, and a second to Carpanè Valstagna the following year. Primolano now became an international border station, though only for a few years, as Trentino-Alto Adige became part of Italy after the First World War.

The line was electrified in the 1980s from Castelfranco Veneto to Venezia Mestre, and in 2003 from Castelfranco Veneto to Bassano del Grappa. Other improvements in the 2000s included a so-called 'light surface metro' - a half-hourly local train service which also services a series of new suburban stations in the Trento region. For this service, new trains of the Minuetto type were bought by Trentino Trasporti in order to replace the old FS Class ALn 668. A similar suburban service might be installed between Mestre and Castelfranco Veneto, but track improvements necessary for such a service are rendered difficult by the Padua-Venice section of the Verona–Venice high-speed railway.

Characteristics
The  railway line is single track all the way from Trento to Maerne di Martellago, near Mestre, where it becomes double track for the last 10 km. The section between Trento and Primolano will be also electrified at 3000 V to improve the light metro services in Trentino. Trains take about 3.5 hours to cover the complete distance, for an average speed of below 50 km/h.

Services
Regional railway services are offered by Trenitalia and Trentino Trasporti from Trento to Bassano del Grappa (hourly), and from Bassano del Grappa to Venice Santa Lucia (hourly, since 2013). Additionally, hourly 'light surface metro' (metropolitana leggera di superficie) services are offered in peak hours between Borgo Valsugana East and Trento and between Castelfranco Veneto East and Venice.

Gallery

See also 
 List of railway lines in Italy

References

Notes

Bibliography 
 
 
 

Railway lines in Trentino-Alto Adige/Südtirol
Railway lines in Veneto
Transport in Trentino
Railway lines opened in 1910